
Starachowice County is a unit of territorial administration and local government (powiat) in Świętokrzyskie Voivodeship, south-central Poland. It came into being on January 1, 1999, as a result of the Polish local government reforms passed in 1998.

As of 2019 its total population is 89,925, out of which the population of Starachowice is 48,646, that of Wąchock is 2,766, and the rural population is 38,513.

Neighbouring counties
Starachowice County is bordered by Radom County to the north, Lipsko County and Ostrowiec County to the east, Kielce County to the west, and Skarżysko County and Szydłowiec County to the north-west.

Administrative division
The county is subdivided into five gminas (one urban, one urban-rural and three rural). These are listed in the following table, in descending order of population.

References

 
Starachowice